Martin Sopko (born ) is a Slovak male volleyball player. He is part of the Slovakia men's national volleyball team. On club level he plays for Mirad Presov.

References

External links
 profile at FIVB.org

1982 births
Living people
Slovak men's volleyball players
Place of birth missing (living people)